Middleton Pope Barrow (August 1, 1839December 23, 1903) was a United States senator from Georgia. Born near Antioch, Georgia, in Oglethorpe County, he attended a private academy and graduated from the University of Georgia (UGA) in Athens, Georgia, with a Bachelor of Arts in 1859 and from the School of Law in 1860. He was admitted to the bar that year and commenced practice in Athens.

During the Civil War, he entered the Confederate service in 1861 and served throughout the war. He resumed the practice of law in Athens and was a member of the State constitutional convention in 1877.

Barrow was a member of the Georgia House of Representatives from 1880 to 1881 and was elected as a Democrat to the U.S. Senate in 1882 to fill the vacancy caused by the death of Benjamin H. Hill, serving from November 15, 1882, to March 3, 1883. He was not a candidate for re-election, and resumed the practice of law in Athens.

From January 6, 1902, until his death, he was a judge of the eastern judicial circuit of Georgia, and died in Savannah, Georgia, in December 1903; interment was in a private cemetery on the family plantation in Oglethorpe County.

Pope Barrow was a great-grandson of Wilson Lumpkin, a U.S. Senator and a Governor of Georgia, as well as a great-grandfather of U.S. Representative John Barrow. Pope's younger brother, David Crenshaw Barrow, Jr., served as the chancellor of UGA from 1906 until 1925, and Pope Barrow served as a trustee of the university from 1872 until 1889.

References

External links

Middleton Pope Barrow entry at The Political Graveyard

1839 births
1903 deaths
Democratic Party United States senators from Georgia (U.S. state)
Georgia (U.S. state) lawyers
Georgia (U.S. state) state court judges
Democratic Party members of the Georgia House of Representatives
People from Oglethorpe County, Georgia
University of Georgia alumni
19th-century American politicians
19th-century American judges